General Roberts Dambītis (May 2, 1881 - March 27, 1957 in Trikāta parish near Strenči, Latvia) was a Latvian soldier and politician.

A founder of the National Soldiers' Union as a Latvian Rifleman in World War I, Dambītis formally became the first soldier in the Latvian Army by placing volunteer units under the command of the People's Council of Latvia when it proclaimed Latvia's independence on November 18, 1918. He was subsequently appointed Deputy Minister of Defense during the Independence War. After the war he served in various high-ranking posts in military supply and administration, culminating in his appointment as Deputy Chief of the General Staff in 1935 and his retirement in 1939.

In 1940, during the first year of Soviet Rule of Latvia, Dambītis joined the puppet government as Minister of War and oversaw the conversion of the Latvian Army to a Red Army Corps. He remained in Latvia after the retreat of the Red Army in 1941, was arrested by the Gestapo and interned in the Sachsenhausen concentration camp until 1945. After the war he returned to Trikāta, where he spent the remainder of his life.

See also 
 List of Latvian Army generals

References
Generals.dk Biographical site (source used by kind permission of site editor, Steen Ammentorp)
The fateful summer of 1940
Latvian Ministry of Defence / History
Arveds Švābe, ed.: Latvju enciklopēdija. Stockholm: Trīs Zvaigznes, 1952–1953.
Lidija Švābe, ed.: Latvju enciklopēdija—papildinājumi. Stockholm: Trīs Zvaigznes, 1962.
Vilis Samsons, ed.: Latvijas PSR Mazā enciklopēdija. Rīga: Zinātne, 1967.

1881 births
1957 deaths
People from Valmiera Municipality
People from Kreis Walk
Ministers of Defence of Latvia
Deputies of the People's Saeima
Latvian generals
Latvian Riflemen
Russian military personnel of World War I
Latvian military personnel of the Latvian War of Independence